John Richard Wharton Smail (born in Cairo in 1930 – 2002) was a University of Wisconsin professor of history, best-known for arguing for an autonomous history of Southeast Asia, i.e. "viewing Southeast Asia in its own terms."

In 1993 a festschrift was published in his honor

Books
Smail, John R. W. Bandung in the Early Revolution 1945-1946: A Study in the Social History of the Indonesian Revolution. Jakarta: Equinox Publishing, 2009. .
Translated into Indonesian by George M. T. Kahin, and Muhammad Y. Aravena. as Bandung Awal Revolusi 1945-1946. , 2011.  . 
Steinberg, David J. In Search of Southeast Asia: A Modern History. David Joel Steinberg, David K. Wyatt, John R.w. Smail, Alexander Woodside ... [etc.] Edited by David Joel Steinberg. London: Pall Mall Press, 1971
Revised ed.  1987

References

1930 births
2002 deaths
20th-century American historians
Cornell University Department of History faculty